Claytus Taqimama (born 21 May 1993) is a male Solomon Islands sprinter. He competed in the 100 metres event at the 2015 World Championships in Athletics in Beijing, China.

See also
 Solomon Islands at the 2015 World Championships in Athletics

References

1993 births
Living people
Place of birth missing (living people)
Solomon Islands male sprinters
World Athletics Championships athletes for Solomon Islands